Harry Locke (10 December 1913 – 7 September 1987) was an English character actor.

He was born and died in London. He married Joan Cowderoy in 1943 and Cordelia Sewell in 1952. He was a good friend of the poet Dylan Thomas. Their friendship in London and South Leigh, Oxfordshire, has been described by Locke in a 1970s interview with the radio journalist Colin Edwards.

Locke was a familiar face in three decades of British cinema, playing small parts such as assorted cockneys, working men, clerks, porters and cab drivers, with appearances including Passport to Pimlico (1949), Reach for the Sky (1956), Carry On Nurse (1959), The Devil-Ship Pirates (1964), Alfie (1966) and The Family Way (1966).

His numerous roles on TV included Randall and Hopkirk (Deceased) as a night porter in 1969. In 1972 he played Platon Karataev in the BBC production of War and Peace, with his final role, playing a gardener, in an episode of Just William, in 1977.

Selected filmography

 The Day Will Dawn (1942) - (uncredited)
 George in Civvy Street (1946) - (uncredited)
 Piccadilly Incident (1946) - (uncredited)
 No Room at the Inn (1948) - Tobacconist (uncredited)
 Passport to Pimlico (1949) - Sergeant
 Private Angelo (1949) - Cpl. Trivet 
 Treasure Island (1950) - Haggott
 The Naked Heart (1950)
 High Treason (1951) - Andy - Telephone Engineer (uncredited)
 Judgment Deferred (1952) - Bert
 Angels One Five (1952) - Look Out
 Father's Doing Fine (1952) - Little Man (uncredited)
 My Wife's Lodger (1952) - Passer-by
 Tread Softly (1952) - Nutty Potts
 Time Bomb (1953) - Train Fireman
 The Red Beret (1953) - Medical Orderly
 Devil on Horseback (1954) - (uncredited)
 Doctor in the House (1954) - Jessup
 The Teckman Mystery (1954) - Leonard
 A Kid for Two Farthings (1955) - (uncredited)
 A Yank in Ermine (1955) - Clayton
 The Long Arm (1956) - Secondhand Dealer
 Yield to the Night (1956) - Fred Hilton
 Reach for the Sky (1956) - Bates
 The Baby and the Battleship (1956) - CPO Blades
 The Silken Affair (1956) - Tobacconist
 Town on Trial (1957) - Sgt. Beale
 The Happy Road (1957) - Emerson (uncredited)
 Doctor at Large (1957) - Porter
 Woman in a Dressing Gown (1957) - Wine merchant
 Barnacle Bill (1957) - Reporter
 Nowhere to Go (1958) - George Bendel (uncredited)
 The Captain's Table (1959) - Hole
 Carlton-Browne of the F.O. (1959) - Gaillardian Commentator
 Carry On Nurse (1959) - Mick the Orderly
 Serious Charge (1959) - (uncredited)
 I'm All Right Jack (1959) - Trade Union Official
 Upstairs and Downstairs (1959) - Train Ticket Inspector (uncredited)
 Sink the Bismarck! (1960) - (uncredited)
 Clue of the Twisted Candle (1960) - Amis
 Light Up the Sky! (1960) - Roland Kenyon
 The Girl on the Boat (1961) - (uncredited)
 The Man in the Back Seat (1961) - Joe Carter
 Watch it, Sailor! (1961) - Ticket Collector (uncredited)
 On the Fiddle (1961) - Huxtable
 Never Back Losers (1961) - Burnside
 Play It Cool (1962) - Train Guard (uncredited)
 She'll Have to Go (1962) - Stationmaster
 Crooks Anonymous (1962) - Fred
 Two and Two Make Six (1962) - Ted
 In the Doghouse (1962) - Sid West
 Tiara Tahiti (1962) - (uncredited)
 Kill or Cure (1962) - Higgins
 The Wild and the Willing (1962) - 2nd Customer
 The Amorous Prawn (1962) - Albert Huggin
 The L-Shaped Room (1962) - Newsagent
 The Small World of Sammy Lee (1963) - Stage Manager
 Heavens Above! (1963) - Shop Steward
 What a Crazy World (1963) - George
 A Home of Your Own (1964)
 The Devil-Ship Pirates (1964) - Bragg
 The Counterfeit Constable (1964)
 The Early Bird (1965) - Commissionaire 
 Alfie (1966) - Foreman (uncredited)
 Arabesque (1966) - Zoo Guard (uncredited)
 The Family Way (1966) - Mr. Stubbs
 Mister Ten Per Cent (1967) - Theatre Heckler - (uncredited)
 Half a Sixpence (1967) - Weight Guesser
 Carry On Doctor (1967) - Sam
 Subterfuge (1968) - Tramp
 Oh! What a Lovely War (1969) - Heckler at Pankhurst Speech
 Carry On Again Doctor (1969) - Porter
 Tales from the Crypt (1972) - Harry the Cook (segment "Blind Alleys")
 The Creeping Flesh (1973) - Barman

References

External links

 South Leigh residents talk about Dylan Thomas

1913 births
1987 deaths
English male film actors
Male actors from London
20th-century English male actors